Illuminati, in both Latin and Italian, means "illuminated/enlightened (ones)" and may refer to a number of intellectuals/philosophers and/or secret societies or religious adepts.

Illuminati and variants of the term may also refer to:

Intellectuals/philosophers
Intellectuals, usually in the context of some academic, literary or social science subject (see also literati, digerati)
Philosophers, by Plato's definition "enlightened ones"

Books
Illuminati, the title of the German and Greek editions of Dan Brown's novel Angels & Demons
The Illuminati, a novel by Larry Burkett
Illuminati (comics), a group of superheroes created by Marvel Comics
Illuminati (Deus Ex), a fictional secret society in the game Deus Ex

Games
Illuminati, a fictional secret society and a player faction in the game The Secret World
Illuminati (game), a card game by Steve Jackson Games
Illuminati: New World Order, another card game by Steve Jackson Games
Illuminati (play-by-mail game)

Albums
Illuminati (The Pastels album)
Illuminati (Ten album)
Illuminati (EP), a 2002 EP by Fatboy Slim
Iluminatti, a 2019 album by Natti Natasha

Songs
"Illuminati" (song), a song by Madonna
"Illuminati", a song by Korn from The Path of Totality
"Illuminati", 1998 song by Malice Mizer
"Illuminati", a song by Ghanaian rapper Sarkodie from the album Sarkology

Other uses
Alumbrados or Illuminati, practitioners of a mystical form of Christianity in Spain
Illuminati II, a cotton brand producing cotton fabrics from Ugandan organic and fair traded cotton

See also
Cabal (disambiguation)
Illuminata (disambiguation)
Illuminate (disambiguation)
Illuminatus (disambiguation)
Illumination (disambiguation)